Maçambará is a small Brazilian municipality in the western part of the state of Rio Grande do Sul. The population is 4,562 (2020 est.) in an area of 1,682.82 km². Its elevation is 110 m. It is located west of the state capital of Porto Alegre and northeast of Alegrete.

The municipality contains part of the  São Donato Biological Reserve, a strictly protected conservation unit created in 1975 that protects an area of wetlands on the Butuí River, a tributary of the Uruguay River.

Neighbouring municipalities

Itaqui
São Borja
Alegrete
Unistalda
São Francisco de Assis

References

External links
http://www.citybrazil.com.br/rs/macambara/ 

Municipalities in Rio Grande do Sul